Moorella may refer to:
 Moorella (bacterium), a bacterial genus belonging to the phylum Bacillota
 Moorella (fungus), a genus of fungi within the phylum Ascomycota
 Moorella (wasp), a wasp genus in the family Encyrtidae